Bard is the third studio album by the English progressive rock band, Big Big Train. It was released in 2002 by Treefrog Records. It is the only one of their early albums that the band decided not to re-release, and as such it is currently out-of-print.

Track listing

Personnel
Ian Cooper - keyboards, piano
Phil Hogg - drums, percussion
Tony Müller - keyboards, piano, lead and backing vocals
Andy Poole - bass, backing vocals
Martin Read - lead and backing vocals
Gregory Spawton - guitars, keyboards, backing vocals

Guest musicians
Jo Michaels - vocals
Rob Aubrey - windchimes

References

External links
 

Big Big Train albums
2002 albums